Buckwalter Building is a historic commercial building located in West Chester, Chester County, Pennsylvania. It was built in 1893, and is a 3 1/2-story, three bay, brick building in an eclectic Romantic Medieval / Late Gothic Revival style.

It was listed on the National Register of Historic Places in 1984.  It is located in the West Chester Downtown Historic District.

References

West Chester, Pennsylvania
Commercial buildings on the National Register of Historic Places in Pennsylvania
Commercial buildings completed in 1893
Buildings and structures in Chester County, Pennsylvania
National Register of Historic Places in Chester County, Pennsylvania
Individually listed contributing properties to historic districts on the National Register in Pennsylvania